P88 may refer to:

 , a patrol boat of the Royal Australian Navy
 Papyrus 88, a biblical manuscript
 Walther P88, a pistol
 WM P88, a sports prototype racing car
 P88, a state regional road in Latvia